Salt City Roller Derby (SCRD) is a women's flat track roller derby league based in Syracuse, New York. Founded in 2007, the league consists of two teams, which compete against teams from other leagues, and is a member of the Women's Flat Track Derby Association (WFTDA).

History
The league was founded by Lishelle Fazzone, who had recently moved to the area, after watching Rollergirls. Originally named Assault City Roller Derby, the league held its first practices in January 2007 at Reva Rollerdrome, in Auburn New York, and played its first bout in February 2008 against the Ithaca  League of Women Rollers.  A few skaters from Utica began training with the league, and this experience enabled them to found Central New York Roller Derby in late 2007.

By late 2010, the league had about forty-five skaters, of whom about thirty were ready to bout.  In July 2011, it was accepted as an apprentice member of the Women's Flat Track Derby Association, and it graduated to full membership of the WFTDA in June 2013.  By the start of the 2016 season, the league had an almost completely new roster and updated logo. On December 16, 2019, the league rebranded and changed its logo and name to Salt City Roller Derby.

Rankings

Rankings

NR = not ranked

References

Roller derby leagues established in 2007
Roller derby leagues in New York (state)
Sports in Syracuse, New York
2007 establishments in New York (state)